Lycurgus John Rickard Underdown (28 August 1904 - 4 November 1984), generally known as "Uncle" Ly Underdown, was a prominent hotelier and businessman in Alice Springs.

References

1904 births
1984 deaths
People from Alice Springs
20th-century Australian businesspeople